Song of the Trees is a 1975 story by author Mildred Taylor and illustrator Jerry Pinkney. It was the first of her highly acclaimed series of books about the Logan family. The novella follows the time Mr. Anderson tried to cut down the trees on the Logan family's land. The story revolves around Cassie Logan who tries to save the trees on her Big Ma's land. Even though Cassie's family needed some money, something told Cassie the trees were just as valuable.

Song of the Trees is followed by three sequels: Roll of Thunder, Hear My Cry (1976), Let the Circle Be Unbroken (1981), The Road to Memphis (1990), and a prequel, The Land (2001).

Characters

The Logan family

The Logan family consists of David (Papa), Mary (Mama), Caroline (Big Ma, David's mother and the children's grandmother). Their children consists of Stacey, Cassie, Christopher-John, Clayton Chester, a.k.a. Little Man, Paul-Edward (Big Ma's husband and David's father).

not The lumbermen 
Mr. Anderson, Tom (Mr. Andersen's partner), and the lumbermen. They make a deal with the Logan family to cut down their trees at first, but are later stopped by David (Papa of the Logan family).

Awards 
Song of the Trees won the Coretta Scott King Author Honor Award 1976.

References

1975 American novels
Novels by Mildred D. Taylor
Picture books by Jerry Pinkney
American novellas
Novels set in Mississippi
Great Depression novels
1975 children's books